Thalassocyon is a genus of sea snails, marine gastropod molluscs in the family Thalassocyonidae.

Taxonomy
Riedel (1995) elevated this genus to a family level (Thalassocyonidae), a vision not supported in Verhaeghe & Poppe (2000), nor in Bouchet, Rocroi et al. (2005)

Distribution
This genus is found from South Africa to the Kermadec Islands and the North Island of New Zealand.

Species 
 Thalassocyon bonus Barnard, 1960
 Thalassocyon tui Dell, 1967
 Thalassocyon wareni F. Riedel, 2000

References

 Barnard K.H. (1960). New species of South African marine gastropods. Journal of Conchology. 24: 438-442.
 Verhaeghe, M. & Poppe, G.T. (2000) A Conchological Iconography 3: The family Ficidae. Hackenheim: Conchbooks

Further reading 
 Powell A. W. B., New Zealand Mollusca, William Collins Publishers Ltd, Auckland, New Zealand 1979 
  Beu A.G. (1969). The gastropod genus Thalassocyon Barnard, 1960. New Zealand Journal of Marine and Freshwater Research. 3(3): 445-452
 Royal Society of New Zealand

Thalassocyonidae
Gastropod genera